Eurema nicippe, the sleepy orange, is a North American butterfly in the family Pieridae. It is also found in the West Indies, Costa Rica and Belize.

Description

The sleepy orange is a bright orange butterfly with the upperside of the wings having wide black borders. The forewing costal margin has a small, narrow black spot. Some people think that the sleepy orange got its name from the black spot that looks like a closed eye; others say that the sleepy orange is a misnomer because, when disturbed, the butterfly has a very rapid flight. The underside of the wings varies seasonally: summer forms are bright yellow with brick-red markings, while winter forms are browner and more heavily marked. It has a wingspan of 1–2 inches (35–57 mm).

Habitat
The sleepy orange may be found in or around old fields, roadsides, woods edges, swamps, wet meadows, open woodlands, margins of ponds, waterways, and valleys.

Life cycle
The eggs are pale greenish yellow and turn red just before hatching. They are laid on the underside of the host plant leaves, or sometimes on flowers. The larva is fuzzy and grayish green, with a whitish-yellow side stripe. The chrysalis varies from green to brownish black. Adult sleepy oranges migrate south to spend the winter. They have two to four broods per year.

Host plants
 Partridge pea, Chamaecrista fasciculata
 Wild sensitive plant, Chamaecrista nictitans
 Senna hebecarpa
 Privet senna, Senna ligustrina
 Senna marilandica
 Senna mexicana
 Senna obtusifolia

Similar species
 Colias eurytheme - orange sulphur
 Eurema proterpia - tailed orange

References

Jim P. Brock, Kenn Kaufman (2003). Butterflies of North America. Boston: Houghton Mifflin. .
James A. Scott (1986). The Butterflies of North America. Stanford University Press, Stanford, California. 
Ernest M. Shull (1987). The Butterflies of Indiana. Indiana Academy of Science. 
Rick Cech and Guy Tudor (2005). Butterflies of the East Coast. Princeton University Press, Princeton, New Jersey. 
David L. Wagner (2005). Caterpillars of Eastern North America. Princeton University Press, Princeton, New Jersey. 

nicippe
Butterflies of North America
Butterflies of Central America
Butterflies of the Caribbean
Butterflies of Cuba
Butterflies of Jamaica